Eva Lundsager (born 1960) is an abstract landscape painter. She received her BA from the University of Maryland and MFA from Hunter College. A 2001 recipient of the Guggenheim Fellowship in the field of Fine Arts, Lundsager has been exhibited in the Jack Tilton, New York at the Greenberg Van Doren, and other galleries. She has also published Ascendosphere, a book of her watercolors.

Biography 

Eva Lundsager was born in 1960 in Buffalo, New York. She grew up in rural Maryland and later earned her BA from the University of Maryland in 1984. After moving to New York in 1985, she earned her MFA from Hunter College in 1988:. She relocated again in 2000 to St. Louis, Missouri with her family. She lived here until moving to Boston, Massachusetts in 2012.

Career 
Lundsager is known for her abstract landscapes completed primarily in oil paint. She also works with watercolor and sumi ink. Lundsager drips, pours, and splatters paint to create a balance of order among non-objective shapes. Her oil paintings are highly impressionistic but capture the meteorological and topographical changes on a landscape. Lundsager describes her watercolor paintings as "acts of 'hysterical ecstasy'". Lundsager's work is highly influenced by painters Marsden Hartley, Charles Burchfield, and Odilon Redon. Her work is evocative of Yayoi Kusama and her signature infinity nets. Lundsager secured her first solo exhibition at the Stephanie Theodore Gallery in Brooklyn, New York in 1993. In 1995 Lundsager was shown in the Jack Tilton Gallery. She received the Guggenheim Fellowship in Fine Arts in 2001. In 2005 Eva Lundsager was exhibited alongside Hans Hoffman in the Greenberg Van Doren gallery. She published a book of her watercolors, titled Ascendoshpere, in 2009. She currently serves as a part-time lecturer at Tufts University.

Permanent collections 
Lundsager permanent collections in the following galleries

 Dallas Museum of Art
 Nerman Museum of Contemporary Art
 St. Louis Art Museum
 The United States' State Department Art in Embassies
 Whanki Museum in South Korea

References 

American women painters
Painters from Maryland
University System of Maryland alumni
1960 births
Living people
Hunter College alumni
Artists from Buffalo, New York
Painters from New York (state)
Artists from Boston
Artists from St. Louis
American abstract artists
American landscape painters
21st-century American women artists
20th-century American women artists
20th-century American painters
21st-century American painters